The Russian Regional Development Bank is a Russian bank founded on 27 March 1996 in a form of PJSC. The RRDB offers a general variety of bank services.

History
The RRDB was founded by Rosneft on 27 March 1996.

In early 2020, the RRDB came to attention for its facilitation of the Vedomosti ownership transaction, and correlative appointment of editor-in-chief Andrei Shmarov, a person known for his affinities to Vladimir Putin and to RRDB parent Rosneft.

External links 
Official website

References

Banks of Russia